Bromine azide is an explosive inorganic compound with the formula . It has been described as a crystal or a red liquid at room temperature. It is extremely sensitive to small variations in temperature and pressure, with explosions occurring at Δp ≥ 0.05 Torr and also upon crystallization, thus extreme caution must be observed when working with this chemical.

Preparation
This reaction forms bromine azide and sodium bromide:

Structure 
The high sensitivity of bromine azide has led to difficulty in discerning its crystal structure. Despite this, a crystal structure of bromine azide has been obtained using a miniature zone-melting procedure with focused infrared laser radiation. Each molecule adopts a trans-bent structure, which is also found in the gas phase.

Reactions
Bromium azide adds to alkenes both through ionic and free-radical addition, each giving an opposite orientation in the products. The ionic addition occurs stereospecifically in trans.
Reactions involving bromine azide are difficult to work with. The molecule is very reactive and is known to explode easily. This makes it a key reagent in explosives. 
Photochemistry experiments with bromine azide have found that UV photolysis of a small sample of bromine azide resulted in dissociation of the entire sample, making it unstable. Similar samples with azide molecules did not show such an effect. This shows bromine azide's unstable tendencies in that even in the presence of sunlight, bromine azide will be a reactive molecule.

Safety
Great care must be taken when handling bromine azide as it is potentially toxic and is able to explode under various conditions. Concentrated solutions in organic solvents may also explode. The liquid explodes on contact with arsenic, sodium, silver foil, or phosphorus. When heated to decomposition it emits highly toxic fumes of bromine and explodes. The amount of compound used during experimentation should be limited to 2 mmol. It also poses a potential moderate fire hazard in the form of vapor by chemical reaction. It is also a powerful oxidant.

It has been banned from transport in the United States by the US Department of Transportation.

References

Bromine(I) compounds
Azido compounds
Explosive chemicals
Pseudohalogens